New Kids: The Final is the second extended play by South Korean boy band iKON. It is the final installment of the group's four-part album series following the single album New Kids: Begin and extended play New Kids: Continue.
It was released by YG Entertainment on October 1, 2018. The mini-album includes a total of four tracks.

Composition
The lead single of the album is titled "Goodbye Road", which was released with a music video on October 1. The song is described as a sentimental hip-hop ballad which talks about the bitter feelings of a breakup.
The music video that features the members and a woman mourning the end of their relationship, interspersing dramatic, reflective scenes with happy memories and choreography. The song's dance emulates its lyrics, with the choral declaration of "good-bye" coinciding with a shooing hand move. 
The three other songs on the album also revolve around the themes of the sadness and loneliness of love and breakups.

Commercial performance
"Goodbye Road" topped both Korean and global charts upon its release. It ranked number one on six major Korean charts, as well as China's QQ Music's real-time chart.

Track listing

Charts

Awards

Music programs

Release history

References

2018 EPs
Korean-language EPs
YG Entertainment EPs
Genie Music EPs
IKon albums